46800 may refer to:

 46800 (number), see 40,000
 46800 (year); see Timeline of the far future
 Xàtiva (postal code: 46800), a town in Valencia, Spain
 A postal code for several communes of the Lot department
 A main-belt asteroid
 A battery size for lithium-ion cylindrical rechargeable battery cells

See also

 
 4680 (disambiguation)
 468 (disambiguation)
 468 AD/CE (ISO year +468)
 468 (number)